Paninsky District  is an administrative and municipal district (raion), one of the thirty-two in Voronezh Oblast, Russia. It is located in the north of the oblast. Its administrative center is the urban locality (a work settlement) of Panino. Population:  The population of Panino accounts for 24.7% of the district's total population.

References

Notes

Sources

Districts of Voronezh Oblast